Salmon Lake is a lake of Ontario, Canada. It is located between Queen Elizabeth II Wildlands Provincial Park and the Kawartha Highlands Provincial Park.

See also
List of lakes in Ontario

References
 National Resources Canada

Lakes of Ontario